Xu Yixin (November 14, 1911 – December 30, 1994) was an associate of the 28 Bolsheviks. He is the sometimes known as the 29th Bolshevik. Because he alternated his political stances between left and right wing, the group is sometimes called the 28 and a half Bolsheviks. He was born in Zhejiang Province and educated at Moscow Sun Yat-sen University in the Soviet Union. He joined the Communist Party of China in 1930. After the founding of the People's Republic of China, he served as ambassador to Albania (1954–1957), Norway (1958–1962), Syria (1962–1965) and Pakistan (1979–1982).

Moscow Sun Yat-sen University alumni
Ambassadors of China to Albania
Ambassadors of China to Norway
Ambassadors of China to Syria
Ambassadors of China to Pakistan
Vice-ministers of the Ministry of Foreign Affairs of the People's Republic of China
Members of the Standing Committee of the 6th Chinese People's Political Consultative Conference
Members of the Standing Committee of the 7th Chinese People's Political Consultative Conference
1911 births
1994 deaths
Chinese Communist Party politicians from Zhejiang
People's Republic of China politicians from Zhejiang
Politicians from Quzhou